Hou Yawen (born 9 September 1998) is a Chinese swimmer. She competed in the women's 800 metre freestyle event at the 2016 Summer Olympics.

References

External links
 

1998 births
Living people
Swimmers from Dalian
Olympic swimmers of China
Swimmers at the 2016 Summer Olympics
Chinese female freestyle swimmers